Cini or CINI may refer to:

People

Surname
 Antoinette Cini (born 1993), Maltese footballer
 Cristina Cini (born 1969), Italian football assistant referee
 Enrico Cini (died 1598), Roman Catholic prelate who served as Bishop of Alife
 Ezio Cini (born 1945), Italian sports shooter
 Francesco Cini (1610–1684), Roman Catholic prelate who served as Bishop of Macerata e Tolentino 
 Giovan Battista Cini (1525–c. 1586), Italian playwright
 Joe Cini (born 1936), Maltese former footballer
 Lucas Cini (born 1999), Brazilian footballer
 Lyda Cini, Countess of Monselice (née. Borelli, 1884–1959), Italian actress of cinema and theatre
 Mathilde Cini (born 1994), French swimmer
 Paul Joseph Cini (born ), Canadian hijacker
 Reginald Cini (born 1970), professional footballer 
 Ruggero Cini (1933–1981), Italian composer, producer, arranger and conductor
 Vittorio Cini (1885–1977), Italian industrialist and politician

Given name
 Cini Boeri (born 1924), Italian architect and designer

Other uses
 Child In Need Institute (CINI), a humanitarian organisation
 Chini Lake (also called Tasik Cini), a series of lakes in Malaysia
 Cini Foundation, Venice, Italy
 CINI-FM, a radio station broadcasting on 95.3 MHz from Mistissini, Quebec, Canada
 Palazzo Cini, Venice, Italy

See also
 Chini (disambiguation)